Anadia pariaensis is a species of lizard in the family Gymnophthalmidae. It is  endemic to Venezuela.

References

Anadia (genus)
Reptiles described in 1999
Taxa named by Enrique La Marca
Taxa named by Oswaldo Oliveros